Willard Zerbe Park (October 14, 1906 – April 15, 1965) was an American anthropologist. Park was a teaching colleague of Maurice Halperin at the University of Oklahoma. Both Park and Halperin actively sought out recruitment with Soviet intelligence, or the "Communist East" through the New Masses and Jacob Golos.  Contacts were made with Elizabeth Bentley through Mary Price.

Biography
He was born in Silt, Colorado. He received his A.B. degree in anthropology at the University of California, Berkeley and finished a year of graduate school also at Berkeley. At Berkeley he met his future wife, Susan Brandenstein (1908–1993), who was also an anthropology student.

Beginning in 1942 Park was the Assistant Chief of the Economic Analysis Section of the Office of the Coordinator of Inter-American Affairs (OCIAA), and later the United Nations Relief and Rehabilitation Administration.

In 1943 Park was interviewed in connection with a Hatch Act investigation.  Much of Parks FBI file is redacted, including his background material, which usually includes routine items like a date of birth, parentage, education, and personal information.

He died in Reno, Nevada.

References

External links
A Guide to the Willard Z. Park field notes, 96-05. Special Collections, University Libraries, University of Nevada, Reno.
A Guide to the Shamanism in Western America: a Study in Cultural Relationships, NC1077. Special Collections, University Libraries, University of Nevada, Reno.

Further reading

 FBI Silvermaster file

American spies for the Soviet Union
Espionage in the United States
1906 births
1965 deaths
People from Garfield County, Colorado
University of California, Berkeley alumni